Shahadat Hussain (1893–1953) was an Indian Bengali-language poet and writer.

Biography
He was born in Chabbish Paragana in West Bengal, India. In 1915, Hussain entered in the writing world in Bani Sommiloni.  In 1931, he said something in an Ein Omanno Andolon, a movement against British government at Kolkata and was sent to prison for three months.

Works
Hussain was a poet, novelist, playwright, and short story writer. Rabindranath Tagore was an influence was on him.

Poetry
Mridongo
Kolpolekha
Rupochanda
Modhuchanda

Novels
Morur Kusum
Hiron Rekha
Parer Pothe
Kheyatori
Sonar Kakon
Rikto
Juger Alo
Pother Dekha
KataFul
Shiri Farhad (a famous work)
Laili Majnu (a famous work)
Yousuf Julaykha (a famous work)

Dramas
Sorforaj Khan
Anar Koli
Masnader Moho

For children
Mohon Vog
Cheleder Golpo
Gulbadan
Jahanara

References

External links

Writers from Kolkata
Indian male poets
Bengali male poets
Bengali-language poets
Bengali writers
Bengali-language writers
1893 births
1953 deaths
20th-century Indian poets
20th-century Indian male writers

Bengali Muslims